The Hodges-Sipple House is a historic house in Artesia, New Mexico. It was built in 1905 for John R. Hodges, the secretary and treasurer of the Artesia Improvement Company, a real estate development company, and the head of the Hollow Stone Manufacturing Company, an artificial stone company. The house was purchased by William Sipple, a real estate developer, in 1909. It has been listed on the National Register of Historic Places since March 2, 1984.

The Hodges-Runyan-Brainard House, another listed house in Artesia, was also built for John Hodges.

References

Houses on the National Register of Historic Places in New Mexico
National Register of Historic Places in Eddy County, New Mexico
Houses completed in 1905
1905 establishments in New Mexico Territory